Battle of Earth may refer to:
 Alien invasion
 Battle of Earth (Marvel Cinematic Universe), a fictional event depicted in the 2019 film Avengers: Endgame

See also 
 Marvel Avengers: Battle for Earth, a 2012 video game
Battle for Earth (disambiguation)